Potamagonum is a genus of ground beetles in the family Carabidae. There are at least four described species in Potamagonum, found in Indonesia and Papua New Guinea.

Species
These four species belong to the genus Potamagonum:
 Potamagonum brandti Darlington, 1971
 Potamagonum diaphanum Darlington, 1952
 Potamagonum julianae Darlington, 1971
 Potamagonum postsetosum Darlington, 1971

References

Platyninae